Nancy Ann Foster Munoz, commonly known as Nancy Munoz, (born September 8, 1954) is an American Republican Party politician who has served in the New Jersey General Assembly since 2009, where she represents the 21st Legislative District. She was appointed minority whip on July 18, 2017, and co-chair of the Republican Conference, alongside John DiMaio, on January 14, 2020.

Munoz has served in the General Assembly as the Deputy Minority Leader since 2022.

Early life
Nancy Ann Foster was born on September 8, 1954 the daughter of Freda and James E. Foster and graduated from Mark T. Sheehan High School in Wallingford, Connecticut. She holds a B.S. and a M.S. (both in nursing) from Skidmore College and Hunter College, respectively.  She has worked as a nurse in Massachusetts General Hospital, the Sloan Kettering Cancer Center, and Overlook Hospital (in her hometown of Summit), and has worked as a risk care manager for Continental Insurance Health Care. Munoz is a resident of Summit. In 1984, she married Eric Munoz in Freehold. She has five children with her late husband.

New Jersey Assembly
Munoz's husband, a New Jersey General Assemblyman, died at the age of 61 from complications from a ruptured aortic aneurysm on March 30, 2009.
In April 2009, Nancy Munoz received the backing of the Union County Republican Party in her efforts to take over her late husband's seat in the legislature.
Long Hill Township Mayor George Vitureira and Long Hill School Board member Bruce Meringolo also sought the seat; Vitureira was backed by Morris County GOP chairman John Sette. The Republican Party held a special convention to determine who would take over the seat in Mountainside on April 27; Munoz won with 174 votes, while Meringolo received 34 votes and Vitureira received 16. She was sworn into the legislature on May 21; she was assigned to serve on the Health and Senior Services Committee and the Human Services Committee, taking committee seats previously held by her husband. Munoz took her first steps towards being elected in her own right on June 2, 2009, when she defeated Meringolo and Vitureira in the Republican primary; she subsequently won the general election and has been re-elected to two-year terms since then.

Committee assignments
Committee assignments for the 2022–23 Legislative Session session are:
Budget
Health

District 21
Each of the 40 districts in the New Jersey Legislature has one representative in the New Jersey Senate and two members in the New Jersey General Assembly. The representatives from the 21st District for the 2022—23 Legislative Session are:
Senator Jon Bramnick (R)
Assemblyman Michele Matsikoudis (R)
Assemblyman Nancy Munoz (R)

Electoral history

New Jersey Assembly

References

External links
Assemblywoman Munoz's legislative web page, New Jersey Legislature

1954 births
21st-century American politicians
21st-century American women politicians
Living people
Massachusetts General Hospital people
Republican Party members of the New Jersey General Assembly
People from Wallingford, Connecticut
Politicians from Summit, New Jersey
Spouses of New Jersey politicians
Women state legislators in New Jersey